Cloacibacillus evryensis is a Gram-negative, anaerobic, mesophilic, rod-shaped and non-motile bacterium from the genus of Cloacibacillus which has been isolated from sewage sludge from a wastewater treatment plant from Evry in France.

References

Bacteria described in 2008
Synergistota